Chicoutimi—Saguenay was a federal electoral district in Quebec, Canada, that was represented in the House of Commons of Canada from 1867 to 1925.

It was created by the British North America Act, 1867, and was amalgamated into the Chicoutimi and Lake St. John electoral districts in 1924.

Members of Parliament

This riding elected the following Members of Parliament:

Election results

By-election: On Mr. Savard being unseated

See also 

 List of Canadian federal electoral districts
 Past Canadian electoral districts

External links
Riding history from the Library of Parliament

Former federal electoral districts of Quebec
Politics of Saguenay, Quebec